The 1909–10 Swiss National Ice Hockey Championship was the second edition of the national ice hockey championship in Switzerland. Seven teams participated in the championship, which was won by HC La Villa, who finished first in the standings.

Final standings

External links 
Swiss Ice Hockey Federation – All-time results

Nat
Swiss National Ice Hockey Championship seasons